"Pilot" is the first episode of the American television sitcom The Big Bang Theory. It originally aired on CBS in the United States on September 24, 2007. It was written by the show's creators, Chuck Lorre and Bill Prady, and directed by James Burrows. The pilot episode introduces the main characters in the series, and also guest stars Vernée Watson and Brian Patrick Wade as Althea and Kurt.

Plot
Leonard Hofstadter and Sheldon Cooper are two intelligent young physicists who have a combined IQ of 360 and claim to have "beautiful minds" that understand how the universe works. However, they are socially awkward, especially around women. After fleeing a visit to a sperm bank for high-IQ donors, they return home and meet Penny, an aspiring actress who has moved into the apartment adjacent to the one they share. Leonard is immediately infatuated and hopes to date Penny, which Sheldon considers unlikely to happen. Leonard persists in at least forming a friendship with her and awkwardly invites her into their apartment to have lunch with them.

Sheldon is quite content spending his nights playing Klingon-language Boggle with their socially dysfunctional friends, fellow geeks Howard Wolowitz, a wannabe ladies man, and Rajesh Koothrappali, who has selective mutism in front of women. However, Leonard is so infatuated with Penny that after letting her use their shower on account of hers being broken, he agrees to try to retrieve her TV from her macho ex-boyfriend, Kurt. However, Kurt de-pants Leonard and Sheldon, and they are unable to retrieve the TV. Feeling bad, Penny offers to buy the guys dinner; Sheldon realizes that Leonard will continue pursuing her.

Unaired pilot
An earlier pilot was produced which did not include Penny, Howard, or Raj. It instead included the characters Katie (Amanda Walsh) and Gilda (Iris Bahr). Katie, like Penny, is a street-smart foil to book-smart Leonard and Sheldon; however, she is meaner than Penny. She claimed to have slept with her stepfather before her mother married him. Moreover, in the original pilot, the character of Sheldon is  more sexual and libidinous. In fact, Sheldon is explicitly stated to have had sex with Gilda, his and Leonard's friend, at a Star Trek convention. CBS passed on the original pilot, but liked the show enough to ask Lorre and Prady to produce a second one.

Reception
Jim Chamberlin of IGN praised the episode, calling it "a great start for the series", and stating that the writing was "some of the best we've seen in a standard sitcom in some time". Matthew Gilbert of The Boston Globe, however, gave a negative review, saying that the show is "one of those laugh-track sitcoms that has exactly one comedy routine and just keeps hammering it home". Scott Tobias of The A.V. Club was very negative about the episode, giving it a D+ rating:

References

External links
 

Pilot (Big Bang Theory)
Big Bang Theory, The
The Big Bang Theory episodes
Television episodes directed by James Burrows

fr:La Nouvelle Voisine des surdoués